On the occasion of the regional elections convened in Venezuela in October 2017, which completed the previous term of Governors, the Bureau of Democratic Unity had proposed the holding of primary elections to choose the unitary candidates to represent them and obtain the victory in each state and circuit.

References

2017 in Venezuela
Primary elections in Venezuela